Xu Ci ( third century), courtesy name Rendu, was an official and scholar of the state of Shu Han in the Three Kingdoms period of China.  An outsider to the province, he and Hu Qian's disorderly conduct would hamper a scholarly project and see his superior put on a play mocking the poor conduct of those involved.

Life
Xu Ci was from Nanyang Commandery (南陽郡), which is around present-day Nanyang, Henan. He was born sometime in the late Eastern Han dynasty and had studied under the tutelage of Liu Xi (劉熈). He specialised in the teachings of the Confucian scholar Zheng Xuan, the Yijing, Book of Documents, Etiquette and Ceremonial, Book of Rites, Rites of Zhou, Mao Commentary and Analects of Confucius. Sometime between 196 and 220, he met Xu Jing and others in Jiao Province (covering parts of present-day Guangxi, Guangdong and northern Vietnam) and later accompanied them to Yi Province (covering present-day Sichuan and Chongqing).

At the time, among the non-native scholars living in Yi Province, there was one Hu Qian (胡潛), whose courtesy name was Gongxing (公興). Nobody knew why he left his home in Wei Commandery (魏郡; around present-day Handan, Hebei) and travelled all the way to Yi Province. While Hu Qian was not as well-read and knowledgeable as the others, he was intelligent and had a very good memory. He memorised and knew by heart everything about Confucian rites, rituals, procedures, protocol, etc., ranging from ancestral worship to the five types of mourning attire.

In 214, after the warlord Liu Bei seized control of Yi Province from its governor, Liu Zhang, he saw that Confucian customs and education in the province were very disorderly due to years of neglect. He wanted to revive Confucianism in Yi Province and establish a set of rituals and procedures for the region, so he set up an education office to oversee this project. Apart from building up a library of Confucian texts, Liu Bei also appointed Xu Ci and Hu Qian as academicians (博士) and ordered them to work with other scholars such as Meng Guang and Lai Min on this project.

While the project was still in its initial stage of development, bitter disagreements and quarrels broke out among the scholars due to differences in opinion. Xu Ci and Hu Qian started making accusations and taking petty revenge against each other including withholding books. They bickered among themselves and constantly sought opportunities to provoke each other. They also praised themselves and scorned their colleagues. When Liu Bei heard about it, he came up with an idea to urge them to put aside their differences and cooperate with each other. He gathered all the officials for a feast and had actors put up a skit parodying the conflict between Xu Ci and Hu Qian, showing how a war of words between them led to them using weapons to attack each other. Despite Liu Bei's efforts, the project ultimately turned out to be a failure.

Hu Qian died before Xu Ci in an unknown year. Following the end of the Eastern Han dynasty in 220, Xu Ci served in the state of Shu Han, founded by Liu Bei in 221, during the Three Kingdoms period. After Liu Bei's death in 223, Xu Ci continued serving under Liu Shan, Liu Bei's son and successor. During Liu Shan's reign, he held the appointment of Empress's Chamberlain (大長秋). He died in an unknown year.

Xu Ci's son, Xu Xun (許勛), inherited his father's legacy and served as an academician (博士) in Shu.

See also
 Lists of people of the Three Kingdoms

Notes

References

 Chen, Shou (3rd century). Records of the Three Kingdoms (Sanguozhi).
 
 Pei, Songzhi (5th century). Annotations to Records of the Three Kingdoms (Sanguozhi zhu).
 Sima, Guang (1084). Zizhi Tongjian.

Year of birth unknown
Year of death unknown
Shu Han politicians
Officials under Liu Bei
Han dynasty politicians from Henan
Liu Zhang and associates